Eois insolens is a moth in the  family Geometridae. It is found in Venezuela.

References

Moths described in 1905
Eois
Moths of South America